Alison Smyth trained in classical vocal performance at The Glenn Gould School in Toronto. She is a performing artist and member of ACTRA and the Canadian Actors' Equity Association (CAEA). In January 2016, Alison launched her own performing arts studio: Alison Smyth Performing Arts. Both in-person and virtually, the studio specializes in personal coaching and group workshops in areas such as acting, singing, directing, mentoring and more. Alison became a certified yoga teacher in 2014 through the Downward Dog Yoga Centre in Toronto.

Performances

Theatrical performances

Film performances

Productions directed

Awards
 Best Actress in a Featured Role (Jersey Boys) - 2010 Broadwayworld.com Toronto Awards
 Arts & Literature - 1999 Spirit of the Capital Awards

References

External links
 Alison Smyth Performing Arts

Living people
Canadian musical theatre actresses
Year of birth missing (living people)